Jens "Jeans89" Kyllönen (born 1989) is a Finnish professional poker player who won the European Poker Tour Copenhagen in February 2009. Kyllönen was the second Finnish EPT winner since Patrik Antonius's victory in 2005. He is an online cash game specialist and plays under the aliases Jeans89 on PokerStars and Ingenious89 on Full Tilt Poker.

In 2009, Jens won the EPT Copenhagen Title for $1,120,815. 

In January 2012, he was awarded Finland's best poker player. Kyllönen was rewarded again as Finland's best poker player in January 2013. In October 2014, Kyllönen became a poker coach for Phil Galfond's training website, Run It Once.

As of 2016, his live poker tournament earnings exceed $2,750,000.

World Series of Poker

References

Finnish poker players
1989 births
Living people